Anthony Christian Potenza (born December 23, 1972) is a Canadian actor and comedian. He is best known for voicing Jude Lizowski on 6teen and Chris McLean in the Total Drama franchise.

Career
He has been on television since 1997, when he first appeared in the television series Riverdale as the character Jimmy.

His performances include appearing as Doug in the CBC Television hockey comedy series The Tournament, as well as CSA Agent Joel in the 2002 Jackie Chan movie The Tuxedo. Most of Potenza's best-known roles are in television commercials, including a giant yellow toothbrush in the "evil gingivitis" commercials for Listerine, a dog in the Fido commercials "The Office" and "The Promotion", as well as a sunflower in Canadian Kia ads. He performed the voice for Jude Lizowski on 6teen; another notable cartoon character is Trevor Troublemeyer on the show Sidekick. He also guest starred in the show Grojband as Party Danimal and performed the voice for Chris McLean in the Total Drama series.

He also appeared in an episode of Colin and Justin's Home Heist in 2007, in which the suburban Oakville home he shares with his daughter Teagan was remodelled.

Potenza also portrays Ryan Archer in the web series But I'm Chris Jericho!.

His YouTube channel, The Infinity Forge (originally called "SwitchBoardNetwork"), largely features videos of his experiences as a voice actor for Teletoon, and has gathered a respectable fan following. He has also guest-starred on various independent animated series on YouTube, including Joey Turner's "Tomy Thomas and Friends" as a spoof of Chris McLean called Chris McTrain.

He also starred in the YouTube show, Inanimate Insanity as MePhone4 in Episode 1 and Episode 18 and in the upcoming interactive video Reddit series Total Drama Hour with Christian Potenza. He co-created the series with Charlie Saylor.

Potenza is currently a professor for the Acting for Film and Television program at Niagara College.

Filmography

Feature films

Television

Internet series

References

External links
 
 Potenza's YouTube channel

1972 births
Living people
20th-century Canadian male actors
21st-century Canadian male actors
Canadian male film actors
Canadian male television actors
Canadian male voice actors
Canadian YouTubers
Male actors from Ottawa